Tour of Iran 2013 is 28th round of Tour of Iran (Azerbaijan) which took place between May 11 till May 16, 2013 in Iranian Azerbaijan. The tour had 6 stage.

Stages of the Tour

Final standing

References

Tour of Azerbaijan (Iran)